Sally Pederson (born January 13, 1951) is an American politician and editor who served as the Lieutenant Governor of Iowa from 1999 to 2007.

Early life and education 
A Democrat, she is a native of Vinton, Iowa. She graduated in 1973 from Iowa State University in Ames, where she was a member of Kappa Kappa Gamma.

Career 
Prior to being elected lieutenant governor on the Vilsack-Pederson ticket in 1998, Pederson served as an executive with the Meredith Corporation in Des Moines, Iowa.  She also worked as an editor for Better Homes and Gardens magazine. She ran for lieutenant governor again in 2002 and was re-elected.

During the 2004 presidential election, prior to the selection of John Edwards as the vice presidential candidate, it was widely rumored that Vilsack would be asked to become presidential candidate John Kerry's running mate. It was later rumored that Vilsack would have been offered a cabinet-level position in the event of a Kerry victory.  Had that occurred, Pederson would have become the first female Governor of Iowa (this distinction ultimately went to Kim Reynolds in 2017).

Pederson declined to run to succeed Vilsack as Governor of Iowa in the 2006 election.

See also
List of female lieutenant governors in the United States

References

External links

1951 births
Lieutenant Governors of Iowa
Living people
Politicians from Des Moines, Iowa
Iowa Democrats
State political party chairs of Iowa
Women in Iowa politics
People from Ottumwa, Iowa
People from Vinton, Iowa
21st-century American women